Alejandro Oms Cosme (March 13, 1896 – November 5, 1946) was a Cuban center fielder in Negro league baseball and Latin American baseball, most notably with the Cuban Stars (East). Born in Santa Clara, Las Villas, he died at age 51 in Havana.

Oms played winter ball in the Cuban League from 1922 to 1946.  He led the league in batting average three times, in 1924/25 (.393), 1928/29 (.432), and 1929/30 (.380), and won the Cuban League's Most Valuable Player Award in 1928/29. He ranks second all-time for career batting average in the Cuban League (behind Cristóbal Torriente) with an average of .345.  He was elected to the Cuban Baseball Hall of Fame in 1944.

Notes

References

External links
 and Baseball-Reference Black Baseball stats and Seamheads
NLB Players Association

1896 births
1946 deaths
Cuban baseball players
Cuban House of David players
Leopardos de Santa Clara players
New York Cubans players
People from Santa Clara, Cuba
Baseball outfielders